Talley (historically ) is a community and small village in Carmarthenshire, Wales.The population taken at the 2011 census was 494.

The community is bordered by the communities of: Llansawel; Cynwyl Gaeo; Llansadwrn; Manordeilo and Salem; and Llanfynydd, all being in Carmarthenshire.

It is the site of the ruined Talley Abbey, a former Premonstratensian foundation destroyed in about 1536 during the Dissolution of the Monasteries.

Notable people
Emanuel Bowen (1694–1767), map engraver
Swampy (born 1973), environmental campaigner

See also
Talley Abbey
Talley Lakes, an SSSI
Talley transmitting station

References

External links 

Communities in Carmarthenshire
Villages in Carmarthenshire